Andersen is a Danish-Norwegian patronymic surname meaning "son of Anders" (itself derived from the Greek name "Ανδρέας/Andreas", cf. English Andrew). It is the fifth most common surname in Denmark, shared by about 3.2% of the population.

From the same root – the given name Andreas – derives the surname Andreasen  (cognate Andreassen) and Andresen .

The numbers of bearers of the surnames Andersen, Andreasen, Andreassen and Andresen in Denmark and Norway (2009):

Persons
Adda Husted Andersen (1898–1990), Danish-born American Modernist jeweler, silversmith, metalsmith, and educator
Aksel Andersen (1912–1977), American-Danish organist and composer
Aksel Frederik Andersen (1891–1972), Danish mathematician
Alex Høgh Andersen (born 1994), Danish actor
Alf Andersen (1906–1975), Norwegian ski jumper
Alf Andersen (musician), Norwegian flautist
Alsing Emanuel Andersen (1893–1962), Danish politician 
Anders Ejnar Andersen (1912–2006), Danish politician 
André Andersen (born 1961), Russian-Danish multi-instrumentalist and composer
Anja Andersen (born 1969), Danish handball coach and former handball player.
Arthur E. Andersen (1885–1947), founder of the eponymous former auditing, tax and consulting firm
Arvid Andersen (1909–1970), Danish composer
Benny Andersen (1929–2018), Danish composer
Bridgette Andersen (1975–1997), American child actress
Børge Andersen (1934–1993), Danish chess player
Carl Albert Andersen (1876-1951), Norwegian pole vaulter
Chris Andersen (born 1978), American basketball player
Daniel Andersen (1885–1959), Danish composer
David Andersen (born 1980), Australian basketball player
Derek Andersen, American DJ
Dorothy Hansine Andersen (1901–1963) American physician, pediatrician, pathologist, identifier of cystic fibrosis
Elisabeth Andersen (1920–2018), stage name for the Dutch actress Anna Elisabeth de Bruijn
Ellen Andersen (1898–1989), Danish museum curator
Else Winther Andersen (born 1941), Danish politician
Eric Andersen (born 1943), American singer-songwriter
Eric Andersen (artist) (born 1940), Danish artist
Erik Andersen (disambiguation), several people
Eyvin Andersen (1914–1968), Danish composer
Francis Andersen (born 1925), Australian scholar of Biblical Hebrew
Frederik Andersen (born 1989), Danish ice hockey goaltender
Fritz Andersen (1829–1910), Danish composer
Ginny Andersen, New Zealand politician
Hakon Andersen (1875–1959), Danish composer
Hans Christian Andersen (1805–1875), Danish playwright and author
Hans Niels Andersen (1852–1937), Danish shipping magnate, businessman and founder of the East Asiatic Company
Hjalmar Andersen (1923–2013), Norwegian speed skater
James Roy Andersen (1904-1945), A United States Army Air Forces General
Joachim Andersen (composer) (1847–1909), Danish flutist, conductor and composer
Joachim Andersen (footballer) (born 1996) Danish footballer 
Johanne Andersen (women's rights activist) (1862–1925), Danish women's rights activists
Johannes Andersen (musician) (1890–1980), Danish composer
Kai Normann Andersen (1900–1967), Danish composer
 Kenneth Andersen, Norwegian player of American football and a member of the Eidsvoll 1814s
Kim Andersen (cyclist) (born 1958), Danish former professional road bicycle racer and current cycling team directeur sportif
Kirsti Andersen (born 1941), historian
Knud Andersen (disambiguation), several people
LaDell Andersen (1929–2019), American basketball coach
Mads Andersen (born 1995), Danish chess grandmaster
Matt Andersen, Canadian musician
May Andersen (born 1982), Danish model
Mikkel Andersen (disambiguation)
Morten Andersen (born 1960), Danish American football player
Neil L. Andersen (born 1951), member of the Quorum of the Twelve Apostles in the LDS Church
Ron Andersen (1941–1997), American bridge player
Roy Andersen (born 1955), Norwegian long-distance runner
Roy Andersen (general) (born 1948), South African businessman and retired general
Sarah Andersen, American cartoonist (Sarah's Scribbles)
Sophus Andersen (1859–1923), Danish composer
Stell Andersen, (1897–1989), American pianist
Stephan Andersen (born 1981), Danish football goalkeeper
Stephen O. Andersen (born 1948), scientist
Theresa Berg Andersen (born 1979), Danish politician
Tom Andersen, American politician
Torben Andersen, American economist
Troy Andersen (born 1999), American football player
Uell Stanley Andersen (1917–1986), American writer
Vilhelm Andersen (1864–1953), Danish author

Fictional characters
 Jesse Anderson (Yu-Gi-Oh! GX), also named Johan Andersen, from the anime Yu-Gi-Oh! GX
 Riley Andersen, from the Disney Pixar film Inside Out

References

See also
 
 
 Anderson (surname)
 Andersson (surname)
 Andresen (disambiguation)

Danish-language surnames
Norwegian-language surnames
Patronymic surnames
Surnames from given names